Metaphryno is a genus of parasitic flies in the family Tachinidae.

Species
Montserratia ovipara Thompson, 1964

Distribution
Trinidad and Tobago.

References

Monotypic Brachycera genera
Diptera of North America
Endemic fauna of Trinidad and Tobago
Exoristinae
Tachinidae genera